Muath Afaneh (born 1 January 1991) is a Jordanian professional footballer born in Saudi Arabia who plays for Al-Lewaa  as a forward.

Career
Muath Afaneh started his career at the Al-Hussein in 2010. On 16 January 2014, Afaneh signed for Al-Sareeh on loan from Al-Hussein. On 16 July 2014, Afaneh joined with Al-Fayha . On 22 December 2015, Afaneh joined with Al-Nahda . On 15 October 2016, Afaneh joined with Al-Jazeera . On 20 December 2016, Afaneh joined with Al-Qaisumah . On 16 July 2018, Afaneh joined with Al-Shoulla . On 18 July 2019, Afaneh joined with Al-Orobah . On 10 January 2020, Afaneh joined Saudi Professional League side Abha. On 27 July 2022, Afaneh joined Jordanian Pro League side Al-Salt. On 2 February 2023, Afaneh joined Saudi Second Division side Al-Lewaa.

References

External links 
 

1991 births
Living people
Jordanian footballers
Jordanian expatriate footballers
Jordanian Pro League players
Al-Hussein SC (Irbid) players
Al-Sareeh SC players
Al-Fayha FC players
Al-Nahda Club (Saudi Arabia) players
Al-Jazeera (Jordan) players
Al-Qaisumah FC players
Al-Shoulla FC players
Al-Orobah FC players
Abha Club players
Al-Salt SC players
Al-Lewaa Club players
Saudi First Division League players
Saudi Second Division players
Saudi Professional League players
Expatriate footballers in Saudi Arabia
Jordanian expatriate sportspeople in Saudi Arabia
Association football forwards